Jesús Sánchez (born 1 March 1953) is a Dominican Republic boxer. He competed in the men's light welterweight event at the 1976 Summer Olympics.

References

1953 births
Living people
Dominican Republic male boxers
Olympic boxers of the Dominican Republic
Boxers at the 1976 Summer Olympics
Place of birth missing (living people)
Light-welterweight boxers